Danville Main Street Historic District is a national historic district located at Danville, Hendricks County, Indiana. The district encompasses 42 contributing buildings and 2 contributing structures in the central business district of Danville. The district developed between about 1865 and 1960 and includes notable examples of Italianate, Classical Revival, Beaux-Arts, and Tudor Revival style architecture. Located in the district is the separately liste Hendricks County Jail and Sheriff's Residence. Other notable buildings include the Hall Block (c. 1900), Danville Public Library (1902-1903), Hendricks County Courthouse (1915), and Danville Post Office (1936).

It was added to the National Register of Historic Places in 2010.

References

County courthouses in Indiana
Courthouses on the National Register of Historic Places in Indiana
Historic districts on the National Register of Historic Places in Indiana
Neoclassical architecture in Indiana
Italianate architecture in Indiana
Beaux-Arts architecture in Indiana
Tudor Revival architecture in Indiana
National Register of Historic Places in Hendricks County, Indiana
Historic districts in Hendricks County, Indiana